The Plum Village Tradition is a school of Buddhism named after the Plum Village Monastery in France, the first monastic practice center founded by Thích Nhất Hạnh. It is an approach to Engaged Buddhism mainly from a Mahayana perspective, that draws elements from Zen and Theravada. Its governing body is the Plum Village Community of Engaged Buddhism.

It is characterized by the application of mindfulness to everyday activities (sitting, walking, eating, speaking, listening, working, etc.). These practices are integrated with lifestyle guidelines called the "five mindfulness trainings", (a version of the Five Precepts), which bring an ethical and spiritual dimension to decision-making and are an integral part of community life.

Mindfulness practices
The sangha is built around a common set of practices to be performed with mindfulness applied to sensory experiences (like listening to the sound of a bell) or activities, such as walking or eating in community. There are also formal ceremonial practices normally performed by the monastics (prostrations, recitations, chanting). Community practices are aimed at facilitating the release from suffering, increasing joy, and experiencing fully the present moment.

The mindfulness practices of the Plum Village Tradition are described on the Plum Village website and the book Happiness by Thich Nhat Hanh. To help cultivate these practices Plum Village encourages the use of Mindfulness apps, including its own for Android and IOS devices. These practices include:

Daily practices
 Breathing: focusing the attention on the breathing sensory experience.
 Waking up: a daily vow to live fully the awake cycle of consciousness after exiting the sleep cycle.
 Sitting meditation: suspension of bodily movements to focus on the inner cognitive processes through metacognition, and eventually transcend that.
 Walking meditation: focus on the experience of the body movements when walking. Steps and breathing can be synchronized, or a simple mantra recited.
 Bell of mindfulness: stopping to focus on the breathing sensory experience upon hearing a sound, normally of a bell.

Physical practices
 Resting: recognizing the natural needs of the body and take the necessary steps to attain rest.
 Mindful Movement: ten body movements practised with conscious breathing to unite mind and body. Based on yoga and tai chi movement.
 Deep relaxation: a practice of lying down and totally letting go, using the breath as an anchor.

Relationship and community practices
 Sangha body: learning to recognize what each individual needs to feel part of a community.
 Sangha building: awareness of organic growth processes of communities.
 Dharma sharing: express experiences as they were felt and cognized.
 Service meditation: volunteering to menial maintenance tasks.
 The Kitchen: food preparation as a meditative practice.
 Eating together: focusing on the several aspects of consuming food (provenance, ethics, purpose, etc.) together with other people.
 Tea meditation: being aware of all aspects of socializing (inner and interpersonal) while drinking tea.
 Noble Silence: suspend or reduce verbal communication to focus on inner processes.
 Beginning anew: reconciliation process after a conflict.

Five Mindfulness Trainings
The Five Mindfulness Trainings are Thich Nhat Hanh's formulation of the traditional Buddhist Five Precepts, ethical guidelines developed during the time of the Buddha to be the foundation of practice for the entire lay Buddhist community.

In southern schools of Buddhism these precepts are typically expressed as undertakings to refrain from harm - not to kill, not to steal, not to lie, not to manifest inappropriate sexual behaviour and not to consume intoxicants. Nhat Hanh's innovation was to express these precepts with an emphasis on the cultivation of virtues on the one hand and as a practice of mindfulness on the other.  Each "Mindfulness Training" has the form "Aware of the suffering caused by ----, I am committed to cultivating ----". Each training is thus an undertaking by the practitioner both to cultivate non-harming, generosity, responsible sexual behaviour, loving speech, and mindful consumption and to be mindful of the suffering caused to self and others when these virtues are absent.

Plum Village movement
As of 2017, the Plum Village movement comprises 589 monastics in 9 monasteries and 1271 communities of practice worldwide.  An important component of this tradition is the Order of Interbeing, which is a social network of monastics and lay people who have undertaken the Fourteen Mindfulness Trainings. There is also a community inspired by this tradition, aimed at young people between the ages of 18 and 35, called Wake Up. Other initiatives include Wake Up Schools and the Earth Holder Sangha.

Monasteries
As of November 2018, there are 11 monasteries and practice centers in the Plum Village Tradition.

United States
 Blue Cliff Monastery, New York
 Deer Park Monastery, California
 Magnolia Grove Monastery, Mississippi

Europe
 Plum Village Monastery, France
 European Institute of Applied Buddhism, Germany
 Healing Spring Monastery (Monastère de la Source Guérissante), France
 Maison de L'Inspir, France

Asia/Australia
 Thai Plum Village, Thailand
 Asian Institute of Applied Buddhism, Hong Kong
 Stream Entering Meditation Center, near Melbourne, Australia
 Mountain Spring Monastery, near Sydney, Australia

Distinguishing characteristics

40 Tenets of Plum Village
The 40 Tenets of Plum Village are an attempt by Thích Nhất Hạnh to identify and define the teachings that are maintained, taught and transmitted in the Plum Village Tradition. They focus on the key relationship of this tradition to the various Buddhist schools and their teachings. 
 These tenets serve as the foundation for the Plum Village teachings for the Mindfulness Trainings undertaken by lay and monastic practitioners.

Community structure
Another distinctive feature of the Plum Village Tradition is the community structure offered by the Order of Interbeing, whose aim is to apply the Bodhisattva ideal in daily life. Both monastic and lay practitioners who undertake the 14 Mindfulness trainings - an extension and modernization of Bodhisattva Precepts by Thích Nhất Hạnh - can be members of the Order. In addition both monastic and lay practitioners can receive the Dharma transmission to become Dharma Teachers in this tradition.

See also
 Engaged Buddhism
 Thích Nhất Hạnh
 Plum Village Monastery

References